Georg Franz (born 9 January 1965) is a German ice hockey player. He competed in the men's tournaments at the 1988 Winter Olympics and the 1994 Winter Olympics.

References

External links
 

1965 births
Living people
Olympic ice hockey players of West Germany
Olympic ice hockey players of Germany
Ice hockey players at the 1988 Winter Olympics
Ice hockey players at the 1994 Winter Olympics
People from Rosenheim
Sportspeople from Upper Bavaria
Starbulls Rosenheim players